Thomas H. Stack  (July 3, 1845August 30, 1887) was an American Catholic priest and Jesuit who served briefly as the president of Boston College in 1887. Born in present-day West Virginia, he studied at the Virginia Military Institute. After the outbreak of the Civil War, he enlisted in the Confederate States Army in 1863, serving as an artilleryman and then in the signal corps until 1865. He enrolled at Georgetown College in 1866, and entered the Society of Jesus in 1868.

Stack then taught physics and chemistry at Georgetown, Boston College, and the College of the Holy Cross, before being appointed the president of Boston College in 1887. He held the office for less than one month before becoming ill and dying.

Early life 
Thomas H. Stack was born on July 3, 1845, in Union, Virginia (located in present-day West Virginia). He enrolled in the Virginia Military Institute, but his studies were halted due to the outbreak of the Civil War in 1861, and Stack enlisted in the Confederate States Army on December 16, 1863. Holding the rank of private, he was first assigned as an artilleryman, and on March 3, 1864, transferred to the signal corps. He is last recorded as an enlisted member of the Confederate Army on January 7, 1865.

Following the end of the war, Stack went on to resume his studies at Georgetown College in Washington, D.C., in 1866. He decided to enroll at Georgetown after hearing its president, Bernard A. Maguire, preach in Virginia. Stack completed his studies in 1868, and entered the Society of Jesus on September 1 of that year. He was eventually ordained a priest in 1881.

Academic career 
Stack served variously as a professor of physics at Georgetown College, at the College of the Holy Cross, and on three separate occasions at Boston College. He also taught chemistry at Boston College, and became the first faculty moderator of The Stylus of Boston College, a magazine founded in 1883. He was a member of the Georgetown College board of directors from 1884 to 1885.

On August 5, 1887, Stack succeeded Edward V. Boursaud as the president of Boston College. His tenure was very short-lived, as he became severely ill with a fever on August 22, and died on August 30. Nicholas Russo was appointed as the vice rector and president of the school.

References

Citations

Sources 
 
 

1845 births
1887 deaths
People from Union, West Virginia
People of West Virginia in the American Civil War
Virginia Military Institute alumni
Georgetown College (Georgetown University) alumni
Confederate States Army soldiers
19th-century American Jesuits
Presidents of Boston College